The 2001–02 Indian National Football League, also known as Tata National Football League for sponsorship reasons, was the sixth season of National Football League, the top Indian league for association football clubs, since its inception in 1996.

Overview
It was contested by 12 teams, and Mohun Bagan won the championship under the coach Subrata Bhattacharya and it was their third title after missing the last title by only a point. Churchill Brothers came second and Vasco came third. Punjab Police and FC Kochin were relegated from the National Football League next season.

League standings

References

External links
 6th "Tata" National Football League at Rec.Sport.Soccer Statistics Foundation

National Football League (India) seasons
1
India